The 2018 Villa Lighting Delivers the Eaton 200 was the 10th stock car race of the 2018 NASCAR Camping World Truck Series season and the 18th iteration of the event. The race was held on Saturday, June 23, 2018 in Madison, Illinois at Gateway Motorsports Park, a 1.25 miles (2.01 km) permanent oval-shaped racetrack. The race took the scheduled 160 laps to complete. At race's end, after a chaotic final restart with three to go, Justin Haley of GMS Racing would win his first ever NASCAR Camping World Truck Series career win and of the season. To fill out the podium, Todd Gilliland of Kyle Busch Motorsports and Johnny Sauter of GMS Racing would finish 2nd and 3rd, respectively. 

The race was the NASCAR Camping World Truck Series debuts for Bryant Barnhill, Riley Herbst, Zane Smith, and Tate Fogleman.

Background 

Known as Gateway Motorsports Park until its renaming in April 2019, World Wide Technology Raceway is a 1.25-mile (2.01 km) paved oval motor racing track in Madison, Illinois, United States. The track previously held Truck races from 1998 to 2010, and returned starting in 2014.

Entry list

Practice

First practice 
The first practice would occur on Friday, June 22, at 4:45 PM CST.

Second practice 
The second practice would occur on Friday, June 22, at 6:35 PM CST.

Third and final practice 
The third and final practice took place on Saturday, June 23, at 11:00 AM CST.

Qualifying 
Qualifying would take place on Saturday, June 23, at 4:45 PM CST. Since Gateway Motorsports Park is under 1.5 miles (2.4 km), the qualifying system was a multi-car system that included three rounds. The first round was 15 minutes, where every driver would be able to set a lap within the 15 minutes. Then, the second round would consist of the fastest 24 cars in Round 1, and drivers would have 10 minutes to set a lap. Round 3 consisted of the fastest 12 drivers from Round 2, and the drivers would have 5 minutes to set a time. Whoever was fastest in Round 3 would win the pole.

Meanwhile, the #74 of B. J. McLeod and the #0 of Camden Murphy would fail to qualify.

Race results 
Stage 1 Laps: 35

Stage 2 Laps: 35

Stage 3 Laps: 90

References 

2018 NASCAR Camping World Truck Series
NASCAR races at Gateway Motorsports Park
June 2018 sports events in the United States
2018 in sports in Illinois